Karan Wahi (born 9 June 1986) is an Indian actor, model and television host. Wahi has also played for the Delhi under-17 cricket team. He started his television career in 2004 with the television show Remix on Star One. He later starred as Dr. Siddhant Modi in the medical youth show Dill Mill Gayye. He showcased his comedy talent in Colors TV's comedy show Comedy Nights Bachao. Wahi participated in the reality shows Jhalak Dikhhla Jaa 5, Fear Factor: Khatron Ke Khiladi 8 and Fear Factor: Khatron Ke Khiladi – Made in India and hosted Nach Baliye, Indian Idol and India's Next Superstars. He made his Bollywood debut with a supporting role in Habib Faisal's romantic comedy film Daawat-e-Ishq (2014). He later made his second Bollywood appearance as one of the leads in Hate Story 4 (2018).

Early life and cricket career
Wahi was born on 9 June 1986 in Delhi to a Punjabi father and a Kashmiri mother. He did his schooling from St. Mark's Senior Secondary Public School and completed his higher education at the IILM Institute.

Wahi began his career as a cricketer, representing St. Mark's Senior Secondary Public School during his school days. In 2003, he was selected for the Under-19 cricket team for Delhi alongside Virat Kohli and Shikhar Dhawan. Owing to a major injury, Wahi had to leave the sport and enrolled in a marketing course to join his father's business.

In 2004, Wahi rose to fame after getting cast in the lead role of Ranveer Sisodia in the show Remix.

Career
Wahi started his acting career with the 2004 "Rose Audio Visuals" television series Remix, where he portrayed the lead role of Ranveer Sisodia, the angry lover boy character, opposite Shweta Gulati. The story of the show was based on the lives of 12th-grade students in an elite school for the kids of the rich and the famous, and scholarship students from poorer families. His performance in the show won him the Indian Telly Award for GR8 Best Male Newcomer. In March 2008, Wahi was a contestant in the celebrity talent hunt show Mr. & Ms. TV judged by filmmaker Madhur Bhandarkar and actress Sonali Bendre.

After a break from fiction shows, Wahi made a comeback in the 2009 Colors TV's soap opera Mere Ghar Aayi Ek Nanhi Pari as the male lead opposite Mugdha Chaphekar. By the following year, he played Dr. Siddhant Modi in Cinevistaas Limited productions' medical drama series Dill Mill Gayye opposite Jennifer Winget.

He was also seen playing the supporting role of a fun-loving guy, Rohan in mid-December 2011 on Sony Entertainment Television's romance-drama series Kuch Toh Log Kahenge. The show was the Indian adaption of the Pakistani television drama series Dhoop Kinare. In September 2011, he appeared in the travel reality show Ritz Jee Le Ye Pal, which he won. In July 2012, he was one of the hosts of the red carpet segment for the 5th Zee Gold Awards. He was cast alongside Kritika Kamra and Mohnish Behl. In 2012, Wahi was paired with Chhavi Pandey to play the lead in Shontara Productions' anthology series Teri Meri Love Stories.

Wahi signed his first movie with Habib Faisal's romantic comedy film Daawat-e-Ishq in 2014. He was seen in a supporting role of a Hyderabadi boy, Amjad alongside Parineeti Chopra and Aditya Roy Kapur.

He also signed to play the male lead opposite Rhea Chakraborty in the 2014 romantic drama film Babbu Ki Jawani, produced by Amritpal Singh Bindra, under the UTV Spotboy productions.

In September 2015, Wahi was seen as a comedian contestant alongside Bharti Singh in Colors TV's comedy show Comedy Nights Bachao. In 2016, Wahi played the lead character in &TV's Kahani Hamari...Dil Dosti Deewanepan Ki.

Wahi has been the host of various red carpet events and awards shows including the Indian Telly Awards and Star Guild Awards. He was the co-host of two seasons of the dance reality show Nach Baliye along with Gautam Rode  He also hosted the additional series of the same show, Sriman vs Srimati along with Aishwarya Sakhuja.

Along with Mandira Bedi, he was next seen co-hosting the singing reality show Indian Idol Junior. In 2015, he replaced Jay Bhanushali for the second season as the host of Dance India Dance Super Moms.

He entered as a wild card in the fifth season of BBC Productions' celebrity dance reality show Jhalak Dikhhla Jaa, but was eliminated next month.

Wahi was seen in two episodes of Colors Television's popular comedy talk show Comedy Nights with Kapil. He was also a part of the winning team of the first season of the reality show Box Cricket League. In March 2015, he participated in the reality game show India Poochega Sabse Shaana Kaun?, hosted by actor Shah Rukh Khan. He also participated Fear Factor: Khatron Ke Khiladi in 2017. He ended up at 8th place. In August 2020, he participated 2nd time in Colors TV's stunt-based reality show Khatron Ke Khiladi - Made In India where he finished at 1st runner-up.

After a gap of 6 years, he made a comeback in July 2022 with Star Bharat's show Channa Mereya as Aditya Raj Singh, opposite Niyati Fatnani.

Off-screen work

In addition to acting, Wahi has also supported various charitable organisations. In 2012, he joined the All Stars Football Club, a celebrity football club that raises fund for India's largest non-profit organisations. He has also participated in the Gold Charity Soccer matches to raise funds for supporting the junior artists of the industry. In August 2014, he took part in the Ice Bucket Challenge to spread awareness for amyotrophic lateral sclerosis (ALS).

Media
In 2013, Wahi featured at number 46 in the UK newspaper Eastern Eye'''s "Sexiest Asian Man on the Planet" list.

He was also ranked 9th in Times of India''s Top 20 Most Desirable Men on Indian Television 2018, 13th in 2019 and 15th in 2020.

Filmography

Television

Web series

Films

Music videos

Awards and nominations

See also
 List of Indian television actors

References

External links

 
 
 

1986 births
Living people
Punjabi people
Punjabi Hindus
Kashmiri people
Indian people of Kashmiri descent
Male actors from New Delhi
Indian male film actors
Indian male television actors
Indian male soap opera actors
Indian television presenters
Indian male models
Indian cricketers
21st-century Indian male actors
Male actors in Hindi television
Male actors in Hindi cinema
Male actors from Delhi
Participants in Indian reality television series
Cricketers from Delhi
Fear Factor: Khatron Ke Khiladi participants